Nouri Dhiab (1 July 1943 – 22 June 2020) was an Iraqi football forward who played for Iraq national football team between 1965 and 1971. He played 15 matches and scored 11 goals.

Dhiab died on 22 June 2020 at the age of 76.

Career statistics

International goals
Scores and results list Iraq's goal tally first.

References

Iraqi footballers
Iraq international footballers
Al-Shorta SC players
Association football forwards
1943 births
2020 deaths